is the fourth in the series of five indies collaboration singles by Japanese girl group Melon Kinenbi, in a collaboration with The Collectors. It was released as limited distribution on October 10, 2009. People that purchased the single from the Tower Records online store received a free original computer wallpaper.

Track listing

Personnel
Lyrics & composition – Hisashi Katō
Arrangement – The Collectors & Hitoshi Yoshida

References

External links

2009 singles
2009 songs